Svetlana Parkhomenko and Larisa Savchenko were the defending champions but only Parkhomenko competed that year with Natalia Medvedeva.

Medvedeva and Parkhomenko lost in the first round to Catarina Lindqvist and Tine Scheuer-Larsen.

Jana Novotná and Catherine Suire won in the final 6–4, 6–4 against Lindqvist and Scheuer-Larsen.

Seeds
Champion seeds are indicated in bold text while text in italics indicates the round in which those seeds were eliminated.

 Lori McNeil /  Betsy Nagelsen (semifinals)
 Jana Novotná /  Catherine Suire (champions)
 Catarina Lindqvist /  Tine Scheuer-Larsen (final)
 Dianne Balestrat /  Catherine Tanvier (first round)

Draw

References
 1988 Virginia Slims of Oklahoma Doubles Draw

U.S. National Indoor Championships
1988 WTA Tour